Barbula is a genus of mosses in the family Pottiaceae.

Species 
The following species are recognised in the genus Barbula:

 Barbula afrofontana (Müll. Hal.) Broth.
 Barbula alpicola Müll. Hal.
 Barbula altipapillosa E.B. Bartram
 Barbula amplexifolia (Mitt.) A. Jaeger
 Barbula anastomosans Müll. Hal.
 Barbula anceps Cardot
 Barbula appressifolia (Mitt.) A. Jaeger
 Barbula aquatica Cardot & Thér.
 Barbula arctoamericana Müll. Hal.
 Barbula arcuata Griff.
 Barbula aureola Müll. Hal.
 Barbula austrogracilis Dusén
 Barbula bagelensis M. Fleisch.
 Barbula bicolor (Bruch & Schimp.) Lindb.
 Barbula bolleana (Müll. Hal.) Broth.
 Barbula brachymenia (Mitt.) A. Jaeger
 Barbula bulbiformis Brid.
 Barbula calycina Schwägr.
 Barbula calyculosa (Mitt.) A. Jaeger
 Barbula capillipes Broth.
 Barbula chenia Redf. & B.C. Tan
 Barbula chocayensis Broth. & Herzog
 Barbula clavicostata (Renauld & Cardot) R.H. Zander
 Barbula confertifolia Mitt.
 Barbula congoana Thér.
 Barbula consanguinea (Thwaites & Mitt.) A. Jaeger
 Barbula convoluta Hedw.
 Barbula coreensis (Cardot) K. Saito
 Barbula costata (Mitt.) A. Jaeger
 Barbula costesii Thér.
 Barbula crocea (Brid.) F. Weber & D. Mohr
 Barbula crozalsii (H. Philib.) Broth.
 Barbula cucullata J. Froehl.
 Barbula cylindrangia Müll. Hal.
 Barbula declivium Müll. Hal.
 Barbula dharwarensis Dixon
 Barbula dioritica Müll. Hal.
 Barbula dissita Müll. Hal.
 Barbula dixoniana (P.C. Chen) Redf. & B.C. Tan
 Barbula dorrii Renauld & Cardot
 Barbula dusenii Müll. Hal. ex Broth.
 Barbula ehrenbergii (Lorentz) M. Fleisch.
 Barbula enderesii Garov.
 Barbula eubryum Müll. Hal.
 Barbula farriae H.A. Crum & E.B. Bartram
 Barbula fendleri Müll. Hal.
 Barbula fidelis H.A. Crum & Steere
 Barbula flavicans D.G. Long
 Barbula francii Thér.
 Barbula frigida Müll. Hal.
 Barbula funalis Dixon & Badhw.
 Barbula furvofusca Müll. Hal.
 Barbula fuscoviridis Broth. ex Thér.
 Barbula geminata Müll. Hal.
 Barbula glaucescens Hampe
 Barbula glaucula Müll. Hal.
 Barbula gracilenta Mitt.
 Barbula gracillima (Herzog) Broth.
 Barbula grimmiacea Müll. Hal.
 Barbula gymnostoma Müll. Hal.
 Barbula hampeana Paris
 Barbula hiroshii K. Saito
 Barbula hispaniolensis W.R. Buck & Steere
 Barbula hosseusii Thér.
 Barbula hyalinobasis Broth.
 Barbula hymenostylioides Broth.
 Barbula inclinans Schimp. ex Besch.
 Barbula indica (Hook.) Spreng.
 Barbula integrifolia (R.S. Williams) R.H. Zander
 Barbula isoindica R.H. Zander
 Barbula jacutica Ignatova
 Barbula janjaninica O'Shea
 Barbula javanica Dozy & Molk.
 Barbula juniperoidea Müll. Hal.
 Barbula kiaeri Broth.
 Barbula lamprocalyx Müll. Hal.
 Barbula laureriana Lorentz
 Barbula lavardei (Thér.) R.H. Zander & S.P. Churchill
 Barbula leiophylla Tixier
 Barbula leucobasis Dixon
 Barbula leucodontoides (Gangulee) Gangulee
 Barbula lonchodonta Müll. Hal.
 Barbula lurida Hornsch.
 Barbula macassarensis M. Fleisch.
 Barbula majuscula Müll. Hal.
 Barbula malagana H.A. Crum
 Barbula marginans Müll. Hal.
 Barbula marginatula Gangulee
 Barbula meidensis Cufod.
 Barbula microcalycina Magill
 Barbula munyensis R.S. Williams
 Barbula novae-caledoniae Müll. Hal.
 Barbula novogranatensis Hampe
 Barbula novoguinensis Broth.
 Barbula occidentalis (Mitt.) Broth.
 Barbula orizabensis Müll. Hal.
 Barbula pachyloma Broth.
 Barbula perlinearis Müll. Hal.
 Barbula pernana Müll. Hal.
 Barbula pertorquescens Broth.
 Barbula peruviana (Mitt.) A. Jaeger
 Barbula pflanzii (Broth.) Herzog
 Barbula plebeja Müll. Hal.
 Barbula potaninii Broth. ex Müll. Hal.
 Barbula pseudoehrenbergii M. Fleisch.
 Barbula pseudonigrescens Tixier
 Barbula punae Herzog
 Barbula purpurascens Dusén
 Barbula pycnophylla Cardot
 Barbula pygmaea Müll. Hal.
 Barbula rechingeri Broth.
 Barbula riograndensis E.B. Bartram
 Barbula riparia Müll. Hal.
 Barbula robbinsii E.B. Bartram
 Barbula rothii Herzog
 Barbula rubriseta E.B. Bartram
 Barbula salisburiensis Dixon
 Barbula sambakiana Broth.
 Barbula satoi (Sakurai) S. He
 Barbula scleromitra Besch.
 Barbula semilimbata Dixon & Luisier
 Barbula semirosulata R.H. Zander
 Barbula seramensis H. Akiyama
 Barbula singkarakensis Baumgartner & J. Froehl.
 Barbula somaliae Müll. Hal.
 Barbula sordida Besch.
 Barbula spathulifolia (Dixon & P. de la Varde) R.H. Zander
 Barbula speirostega Müll. Hal.
 Barbula stenocarpa Hampe
 Barbula subcalycina Müll. Hal.
 Barbula subcernua Schimp.
 Barbula subcespitosa (Hampe) Broth.
 Barbula subcomosa Broth.
 Barbula subdenticulata Dixon.
 Barbula subglaucescens Müll. Hal.
 Barbula subgrimmiacea Thér.
 Barbula subobtusa Thér.
 Barbula subpellucida Mitt.
 Barbula subreflexifolia Müll. Hal.
 Barbula subreplicata Broth.
 Barbula subrufa Broth. ex Müll. Hal.
 Barbula subruncinata Müll. Hal.
 Barbula sumatrana Baumgartner & Dixon
 Barbula swartziana Müll. Hal.
 Barbula tenuicoma Müll. Hal. ex Broth.
 Barbula tenuirostris Brid.
 Barbula thelimitria Müll. Hal.
 Barbula tisserantii (P. de la Varde) P. de la Varde
 Barbula tortelloides Müll. Hal.
 Barbula translucens Salzm. ex Bruch
 Barbula trichomanoides Broth. ex Ihsiba
 Barbula tuberculosa (Renauld & Paris) Cardot
 Barbula umtaliensis Magill
 Barbula uncinicoma Müll. Hal.
 Barbula unguiculata Hedw.
 Barbula unguiculatula Müll. Hal.
 Barbula vaginata Warnst.
 Barbula vardei R.S. Chopra
 Barbula ventanica Müll. Hal.
 Barbula vulcanica Lorentz
 Barbula williamsii (P.C. Chen) Z. Iwats. & B.C. Tan
 Barbula zambesiaca Magill
 Barbula zennoskeana B.C. Tan

References

Pottiaceae
Moss genera